St Aldate's is a street in central Oxford, England, named after Saint Aldate, but formerly known as Fish Street.

The street runs south from the generally acknowledged centre of Oxford at Carfax. The Town Hall, which includes the Museum of Oxford, is on the east side of the street. Christ Church, with its imposing Tom Tower, faces the east end of St Aldate's, while Pembroke College (on Pembroke Square) faces its west end. Other adjoining streets include Blue Boar Street to the east side and Pembroke Street, Pembroke Square, Brewer Street, Rose Place, and Speedwell Street to the west. St Aldate's Church is on the west side of the street, in Pembroke Square.

Opposite Christ Church is Alice's Shop, formerly frequented by Alice Liddell, and the model for the Sheep Shop in the "Wool and Water" chapter in Through the Looking-Glass.

South of Christ Church is an entrance to Christ Church Meadow and, still on the east side, the University of Oxford's Faculty of Music, containing the Bate Collection of Musical Instruments; the building was opened in 1936 for St Catherine's Society. Oxford's police station (designed by H. F. Hurcombe, the City Estates Surveyor, and completed in 1936) and the Oxford Combined Court Centre (designed by Henry Smith and completed in 1932) opposite precede a junction with Thames Street to the west.

The police station was featured in the Inspector Morse television series.

After Folly Bridge over the River Thames or Isis, St Aldate's enters Grandpont and becomes Abingdon Road (A4144), leading directly south out of the city of Oxford towards the Oxford Ring Road and the villages of Kennington & Radley and the town of Abingdon.

Gallery

References

External links 
 Oxford Guide information
 St Aldate's Church
 St Aldate's Post Office
 Oxford's Town Halls in St Aldate's

Streets in Oxford
Christ Church, Oxford